Shadow Child  is a novel by American horror and paranormal folklore author Joseph A. Citro.  It was originally published on July 1, 1987, before his novel Lake Monsters, but was republished by University Press of New England on September 1, 1998. The novel depicts the psychological and emotional impacts of mysterious disappearances and deaths.

Plot
The main character is Eric Nolan, brother, son, and widower. After the death of his parents, the death of his wife, and his brother's disappearance, Eric decides to move back to his childhood home in Bennington County, Vermont where his cousin Pamela lives with her own family. Mysterious things start happening in the nearby woods, part of the Bennington Triangle that is known for several unsolved disappearances.

References

 
 Citro, Joseph A. Shadow Child. New England: University Press of New England, 1998. Print

1987 British novels
British horror novels
Novels set in Vermont
1987 debut novels
Zebra Books books